My Way is an album by American singer Frank Sinatra, released in 1969 on his own Reprise label.

The album is mainly a collection of then-contemporary pop songs, such as Simon and Garfunkel's "Mrs. Robinson", and The Beatles' "Yesterday", French songs such as "If You Go Away", and the anthemic title song "My Way", which effectively became Sinatra's theme song in this stage of his career.

On December 30, 1968 in Los Angeles, a few hours before going to celebrate the New Year 1969, at the Sands Casino from Las Vegas, My Way was recorded and mixed at EastWest Studios, then called Oceanway Recording. Later it was remixed and reissued by Concord Records in 2009 to mark its 40th Anniversary. Two bonus tracks were included, and new liner notes from Bono. The bonus tracks were a rehearsal of "For Once in My Life" from 1969, for Sinatra's eponymous Emmy Award nominated 1969 television special, Sinatra, and a live 1987 performance of "My Way" at the Reunion Arena, Dallas, Texas.

Bono's liner notes had previously appeared as his New York Times Op-ed column on January 9, 2009. The article discussed Bono's personal relationship with Sinatra, and Sinatra's thoughts on Miles Davis. Bono also mused on Sinatra's performances of "My Way", and the new year.

Track listing

Standard edition
"Watch What Happens" (Norman Gimbel, Michel Legrand, Jacques Demy) – 2:17
"Didn't We?" (Jimmy Webb) – 2:55
"Hallelujah, I Love Her So" (Ray Charles) – 2:47
"Yesterday" (Lennon–McCartney) – 3:56
"All My Tomorrows" (Sammy Cahn, Jimmy Van Heusen) – 4:35
"My Way" (Paul Anka, Claude François, Jacques Revaux, Gilles Thibault) – 4:35
"A Day in the Life of a Fool" (Luiz Bonfá, Carl Sigman) – 3:00
"For Once in My Life" (Ron Miller, Orlando Murden) – 2:50
"If You Go Away" (Jacques Brel, Rod McKuen) – 3:30
"Mrs. Robinson" (Paul Simon) – 2:55

2009 Concord bonus tracks
"For Once in My Life" – 4:11 studio rehearsal, NBC Studio 2, Burbank, California, August 13, 1969
"My Way" – 3:09 live performance at the Reunion Arena, Dallas, Texas, October 24, 1987

2019 Capitol bonus tracks 
"My Way" - 4:23 Duet with Willie Nelson
"My Way" - 3:32 Duet with Luciano Pavarotti
"My Way" - 4:36 Live at the Ahmanson Theatre, June 13, 1971
"My Way" - 3:43 Live at Reunion Arena, October 24, 1987

Personnel 
 Frank Sinatra – vocals
 Don Costa – arranger, conductor

Certifications

References 

1969 albums
Albums arranged by Don Costa
Albums conducted by Don Costa
Albums produced by Sonny Burke
Albums produced by Don Costa
Concord Records albums
Frank Sinatra albums
Reprise Records albums